"Keep On Pushing Love" is a song by Al Green. It was released as a single in 1994, initially in promotion of Green's 1993 album Don't Look Back, but like previous single "Love Is a Beautiful Thing", was later included on his 1995 album Your Heart's in Good Hands. "Keep On Pushing Love" was produced by Arthur Baker and co-written with Lotti Golden, Al Green and Tommy Faragher. The single invokes "the original, sparse sound of his [Green's] early classics."

Track listing
 "Keep On Pushing Love" (Joey Negro's Extended 12" Mix)	
 "Keep On Pushing Love" (Joey Negro's Old School Mix)
 "Keep On Pushing Love" (Absolute Remix)
 "Keep On Pushing Love" (Joey Negro's Deep Space Mix)

References

Al Green songs
1994 singles
1994 songs
Songs written by Lotti Golden
Songs written by Tommy Faragher
Songs written by Arthur Baker (musician)
Songs written by Al Green
RCA Records singles
Song recordings produced by Arthur Baker (musician)